Major Albert Walter De Wilton (1862–13 October 1931) was the fifth British colonial Inspector-General of Police in Ceylon (Sri Lanka).

Wilton was born in Samalkota, India, in 1862, the second son of Dr Jacob Wilkins (1830–1879) and Judith Laura née Montefiore (1835–1899). He received his early education at Brighton and Southsea Military College, where he graduated in 1880. He joined the militia the following year, attending Royal Military Academy Sandhurst, obtaining his commission in 1883 as a Lieutenant in the Connaught Rangers. He saw active service in the Burma Campaigns of 1885, 1887 and 1889 and was awarded a medal and two clasps.

In 1898 he was appointed Major-General of Police in Mauritius. In 1902 he was transferred to Ceylon, assuming the position of Inspector-General of Police and Prisons on 17 August 1902. In 1905 due to the increase in workload the position was separated into two posts with De Wilton continuing in the role of Inspector-General of Prisons and Superintendent of Convict Establishments and Cyril Longden, the Superintendent of Police in Madras was transferred to take on the role of Inspector General of Police. He retired in 1922 when he was 60. De Wilton died in Jersey on 13 October 1931.

References

1862 births
1931 deaths
British colonial police officers
Sri Lankan Inspectors General of Police
British people in colonial India